Sir Arthur Cotton (1803–1899) was a British general in India.

Arthur Cotton may also refer to:
Arthur Cotton (politician) (1853–1920), Australian politician in Tasmania
Arthur Stedman Cotton (1873–1952), British artillery general
Arthur Disbrowe Cotton (1879–1962), British botanist